The Freeway League is a high school athletic league that is part of the CIF Southern Section. Members are Fullerton Joint Union High School District high schools in Orange County.

Schools
Buena Park High School
Fullerton Union High School
La Habra High School
Sonora High School
Sunny Hills High School
Troy High School

References

CIF Southern Section leagues
Sports in Orange County, California